Prasophyllum macrotys, commonly known as the inland leek orchid, is a species of orchid endemic to the south-west of Western Australia. It has a single tubular leaf and up to thirty greenish to purplish flowers and is similar to the tall leek orchid (P. elatum) but has smaller, darker flowers.

Description
As with others in the genus, the flowers are inverted so that the labellum is above the column rather than below it. The lateral sepals are joined to each other and the relatively short petals face forwards. The labellum is white and narrowed near the middle, where it turns upwards through about 90°. The upturned part has a wavy edge. Flowering occurs from August to October.

Taxonomy and naming
Prasophyllum macrotys was first formally described in 1840 by John Lindley and the description was published in A Sketch of the Vegetation of the Swan River Colony.<ref name=APNI>{{cite web|title=Prasophyllum macrotys''''|url= https://id.biodiversity.org.au/instance/apni/534780|publisher=APNI|accessdate=27 November 2017}}</ref> Lindley did not give a reason for using the specific epithet macrotys but "macrotys" is one of the common names given to the plant Actaea racemosa.

Distribution and habitat
The inland leek orchid  grows in woodland and shrubland between Kalbarri and Lake King in the Avon Wheatbelt, Esperance Plains, Geraldton Sandplains and Jarrah Forest biogeographic regions.<ref name=FloraBase>{{FloraBase|name=Prasophyllum macrotys''|id=11125}}</ref>

ConservationPrasophyllum macrotys'' is classified as "not threatened" by the Western Australian Government Department of Parks and Wildlife.

References

External links 
 

macrotys
Endemic flora of Western Australia
Endemic orchids of Australia
Plants described in 1840